Stefano Gualeni, Ph.D., is an Italian philosopher and game designer who created videogames such as Tony Tough and the Night of Roasted Moths, Gua-Le-Ni; or, The Horrendous Parade, and Something Something Soup Something.

Gualeni is an associate professor at the Institute of Digital Games of the University of Malta, where he pursues academic research in the fields of philosophy of technology, game design, virtual worlds research, science fiction, and existentialism.

Since 2015, he is a visiting professor in game design at the Laguna College of Art and Design of Laguna Beach, California.

He is also currently a visiting researcher at the Ritsumeikan Center for Game Studies (RCGS) at the Ritsumeikan University of Kyoto, Japan.

For a few months in 2019 he was a visiting researcher at Centre of the Digital Humanities of the University of Gothenburg, Sweden.

Background 
Born in Lovere, Italy, in 1978, Gualeni graduated in 2004 in architecture at the Politecnico di Milano. His final thesis was developed in Mexico supported by ITESM (Tec de Monterrey, Campus Ciudad de Mexico).

Gualeni was awarded his Master of Arts in 2008 at the Utrecht School of the Arts. In his thesis, he proposed a model for digital aesthetics inspired by Martin Heidegger's existential phenomenology.

He obtained his Ph.D. in Philosophy (existentialism and philosophy of technology) at the Erasmus University Rotterdam in 2014. His dissertation, titled Augmented Ontologies, focuses on virtual worlds in their role as mediators: as interactive, artificial environments where philosophical ideas, world-views, and thought-experiments can be experienced, manipulated, and communicated experientially.

Academic work 
Gualeni's work takes place in the intersection between continental philosophy and the design of virtual worlds. Given the practical and interdisciplinary focus of his research - and depending on the topics and the resources at hand - his output takes the form of academic texts and/or of interactive digital experiences. In his articles and essays, he presents computers as instruments to prefigure and design ourselves and our worlds, and as gateways to experience alternative possibilities of being.

In 2015, Gualeni released the book Virtual Worlds as Philosophical Tools: How to Philosophize with a Digital Hammer with Palgrave Macmillan. Inspired by post-phenomenology and by Martin Heidegger's philosophy of technology, the book attempts to answer questions such as: will experiencing worlds that are not 'actual' change our ways of structuring thought? Can virtual worlds open up new possibilities to philosophize?

His 2020 book with Daniel Vella, Virtual Existentialism: Meaning and Subjectivity in Virtual Worlds, engages with the question of what it means to exist in virtual worlds. Drawing from the tradition of existentialism, it introduces the notion of 'virtual subjectivity' and discusses the experiential and existential mechanisms by which can move into, and out of, virtual subjectivities. It also includes chapters that specifically leverage the work of Helmuth Plessner, Peter W. Zapffe, Jean-Paul Sartre and Eugen Fink to think through the existential significance of the virtual.

His contributions to the edited volumes Experience Machines: Philosophy in Virtual Worlds, Towards a Philosophy of Digital Media, and Perspectives on the European Videogame similarly focus on the experiential and existential effects and possibilities disclosed by virtual technologies.

One of the central themes of Gualeni's work revolves around the fact that the history of philosophy has, until recently, merely been the history of written thought. He argues that we are, however, witnessing a technological shift in how philosophy is pursued, valued, and communicated. In that respect, Gualeni advances the claim that digital media can constitute an alternative and a complement to our almost-exclusively linguistic approach to developing and communicating thought. He considers virtual worlds to be philosophically viable and advantageous in contexts like thought experiments  (where we can objectively test and evaluate possible courses of action and corresponding consequences), in the case of philosophical inquiries concerning non-actual state of affairs, and for research into non-human phenomenologies.

Books

Monographic books 

 Gualeni, S. & Fassone, R. 2023. Fictional Games: A Philosophy of Worldbuilding and Imaginary Play. London (UK): Bloomsbury.
 Gualeni, S. & Vella, D. 2020. Virtual Existentialism: Meaning and Subjectivity in Virtual Worlds. Basingstoke (UK): Palgrave Pivot.
 Gualeni, S. 2015. Virtual Worlds as Philosophical Tools: How to Philosophize with a Digital Hammer. Basingstoke (UK): Palgrave MacMillan.

Book chapters 
 Van de Mosselaer, N. & Gualeni, S. 2022. “Representing Imaginary Spaces: Fantasy, Fiction, and Virtuality”. In Gottwald, D., Vahdat, V., Turner-Rahman, G. (eds.) Virtual Interiorities. Pittsburgh (PA): ETC Press, Vol. 3, pp. 21–44.
 Gualeni, S. & Vella, D. 2021. “Existential Ludology and Peter Wessel Zapffe”. In Navarro-Remesal, V. & Pérez-Latorre O. (eds.) Perspectives on the European Videogame, 175-192. Amsterdam (The Netherlands): Amsterdam University Press.
Gualeni, S. 2019. “Virtual World-Weariness: On Delaying the Experiential Erosion of Digital Environments”. In Gerber, A. and Goetz, U. (eds.) The Architectonics of Game Spaces: The Spatial Logic of the Virtual and its Meaning for the Real, 153–165. Bielefeld (Germany): Transcript.
 Gualeni, S. 2018. “A Philosophy of ‘DOING’ in the digital”. In Romele, A. and Terrone, E. (eds.), Towards a Philosophy of Digital Media, 225–255. Basingstoke (UK): Palgrave Macmillan.
 Gualeni, S. 2017. “VIRTUAL WELTSCHMERZ: Things to keep in mind while building experience machines and other tragic technologies”. In Silcox, M. (ed.), Experience Machines: The Philosophy of Virtual Worlds, 113–136. London (UK): Rowman and Littlefield International.
 Gualeni, S. 2015. “Playing with Puzzling Philosophical Problems”. In Zagalo, N. and Branco, P. (eds.). Creativity in the Digital Age. Springer Series on Cultural Computing, XIV, 59–74. London (UK): Springer-Verlag.

Playable academic works 

Stefano is a philosopher who designs games videogames and a game designer who is passionate about philosophy. Although his academic work largely takes the form of texts, he also designs virtual experiences that have the specific objective of disclosing thought experiments and ideas in ways that are interactive and negotiable (and perhaps even playful).

The following are part of his ongoing 'playable philosophy' project:
Doors (the game) (2021): a weird, postmodern point and click adventure videogame about how objects (and doors in particular) are represented within videogames
"HERE" (2018): a mock-JRPG playfully invites to reflect on how many types of 'here' co-exist in a virtual world
Something Something Soup Something (2017): a short first-person adventure videogame about analytical definitions and family resemblances
Necessary Evil (2013): a self-reflexive game about the centrality of player-experience in videogame design
Other playable academic works:

 Construction BOOM! (2020) a strategic 2-player tile-laying game meant as a satirical take on the unrestrained residential construction in Malta. The game was a finalist for SaltCON's 2021 Ion Award in the Strategy Category.
 CURIO (2021): a free, playful toolkit for primary school students to be used in class, part of a 3-year research project funded by the Erasmus+ program

Commercial titles released as game designer

 Gua-Le-Ni; or, The Horrendous Parade (2011) (iPad)
 Prezzemolo in una Giornata da Incubo (2007) (DVD TV game)
 Tony Tough 2: A Rake's Progress (2006) (PC)
 Midway Classics 2 (2006) (GBA)
 Midway Classics 1 (2006) (GBA)
 Dangerous Heaven (2005) (DVD TV game)
 Prezzemolo in una Giornata da Incubo (2003) (PC)
 Tony Tough and the Night of Roasted Moths (1997) (PC)
 Mikro Mortal Tennis (1996) (Amiga)

Other game industry credits

Stefano is listed in the 'extra credits' of the 2013 Independent Games Festival (IGF) 'Student Showcase finalist' videogame ATUM for having acted as project supervisor and game design consultant.
Stefano designed Necessary Evil, a small, critical videogame developed together with Dino Dini, Marcello Gòmez Maureira and Jimena Sànchez Sarquiz. The game was presented at the 2013 Digital Games Research Association conference in Atlanta as an example of the meta-reflexive and critical potential of the medium.
Stefano is listed in the credits of the 2012 action-adventure videogame The Unfinished Swan (PlayStation 3, developed by Giant Sparrow) for having tested early versions of the game and having provided design-related feedback.
Gualeni appears in the credits of Playlogic Entertainment's 2009 hack-and-slash videogame Fairytale Fights (for PlayStation 3 and Xbox 360) for having helped with quality assurance recruiting and training.
Stefano is thanked in the credits of the videogame EXP for having helped with the structuring of the game concept and having acted as project supervisor. EXP received honorable mention in the 2011 Independent Games Festival Student Showcase.
Stefano is in the 'special thanks' section of the credits of the videogame Chewy! for having provided game design guidance. Chewy! was honored with the 'Best Design' award ($25,000) at the 2011 Independent Propeller Awards at the South by Southwest (SXSW) festival in Austin, Texas.

External links
Stefano Gualeni's personal website
Prof. Stefano Gualeni's profile at the University of Malta
The website of the Institute of Digital Games at the University of Malta
A selection of Gualeni's articles and publications
The website for the free, philosophical videogame NECESSARY EVIL
Something Something Soup Something: playable philosophy
The website for the free, philosophical videogame HERE
Construction BOOM! A satirical tile-laying board game free to print-and-play
The official website for CURIO, the free, playful toolkit to stimulate curiosity in primary school students
Doors (the game): a playable philosophical essay

Footnotes

Italian video game designers
Video game designers
Video game researchers
Philosophers of technology
1978 births
Living people
Italian designers
Polytechnic University of Milan alumni
Utrecht School of the Arts alumni
Erasmus University Rotterdam alumni
People from Lovere
Academic staff of the University of Malta
Maltese academics